The Wild Card is the ninth studio album by American singer Ledisi. It was released on August 28, 2020, by Listen Back Entertainment. The album marked Ledisi's first independent project with the label, following a decade as a major signee with Verve Records. "Anything For You" earned Ledisi her first career Grammy Award, in the Best Traditional R&B Performance category, in 2021. The album will be further promoted by a North American tour in the fall of 2021.

Critical reception

Any Kellman, writing for AllMusic, wrote that Ledisi "and her supporting musicians still incorporate shades of bygone eras with natural grace. Even the overtly retro moments retain a freshness, and whenever a song bears some obvious likeness, Ledisi's entrancing and singular voice – bolstered by some subtly dazzling harmonies and arrangements – is at the fore to distinguish it. A spirit of unrestrained individualism powers some of the best material."

Track listing

Charts

Release history

References

2020 albums
Ledisi albums